Les Sacqueboutiers, formerly Les Saqueboutiers de Toulouse, are French early music wind and brass ensemble founded in 1976 by Jean-Pierre Canihac and Jean-Pierre Mathieu at Toulouse. They play the cornet à bouquin and the sackbut, with other instruments supporting. Artistic direction is conducted by Jean-Pierre Canihac and Daniel Lassalle. In 2008 les Sacqueboutiers  were « Ensemble de l'année » at the Victoires de la musique classique.

Notes and references

External links 
 Site des Sacqueboutiers

Early music groups